Greatest Hits is a compilation album from Black Sabbath, released by Universal in 2009.

This album features only the original line-up of Black Sabbath with most of the albums Ozzy Osbourne worked on presented. This compilation features songs from 1970's self-titled debut album to Sabbath Bloody Sabbath, as well as one song from Never Say Die!.

This compilations used the same masters from the Universal 2009 album remasters.

A similar compilation of the same name was released outside North America by NEMS Records in 1977.

The album was re-released in 2012 as Iron Man: The Best of Black Sabbath with identical track listing but different artwork.

Track listing

Personnel
Black Sabbath
Ozzy Osbourne - vocals
Tony Iommi - guitar, piano & Mellotron on Changes 
Geezer Butler - bass, Mellotron on Changes
Bill Ward - drums

Release history

Charts

Certifications

References

2009 greatest hits albums
Black Sabbath compilation albums
Universal Records compilation albums
Albums produced by Patrick Meehan (producer)